Peterborough Speedway is a 1/3 mile semi-banked short track motor racing paved oval, located west of the city of Peterborough, in Cavan, Ontario, Canada. The Speedway’s weekly Saturday night racing program runs from May to October each year, featuring Bone Stocks, Mini Stocks, Renegade Trucks, Legends, Super Stock and Late Models. The track regularly features touring series including the APC United Late Model Series, OSCAAR Modifieds and Hot Rods, Ontario Outlaw Super Late Models, Can-Am Midgets and their season finishes with the annual Autumn Colours Classic weekend.

History
Peterborough Speedway was known as Westgate Speedway when it opened for the first time on Sunday May 28, 1967.  The four original owners from the Peterborough area built the track at a cost of $70,000. New ownership renamed the facility Peterborough Speedway in 1986 and the track celebrated its 50th anniversary in 2017.

Autumn Colours Classic
Since 1993, Peterborough Speedway has presented the "Autumn Colours Classic" during the Thanksgiving holiday weekend in October. The three days of racing features close to 10 different divisions of drivers and teams from across the province and is considered one of the most important stock car events in Ontario.

See also
List of auto racing tracks in Canada
Kawartha Speedway
Mosport Speedway

References

External links
Peterborough Speedway
Motorsport venues in Ontario
Paved oval racing venues in Ontario
Motorsport in Canada
1967 establishments in Ontario
Sports venues completed in 1967
Tourist attractions in Peterborough County
Buildings and structures in Peterborough, Ontario